Barton Moss railway station was in Peel Green, Lancashire, England.

History

The original Liverpool and Manchester Railway station at Barton Moss opened in 1832 and was replaced on 1 May 1862 by a new one  due east.

This second station was opened by the London and North Western Railway; it duly passed to the London, Midland and Scottish Railway (LMS) at the 1923 Grouping.

The LMS closed the station on 23 September 1929.

References

External links
The first station via Disused Stations UK
The first station on an 1849 OS map as "Barton" via National Library of Scotland
The second station via Disused Stations UK
The second station on a 1948 OS map via npe Maps
The line and mileages via railwaycodes

Disused railway stations in Salford
Former London and North Western Railway stations
Railway stations in Great Britain opened in 1832
Railway stations in Great Britain closed in 1929
1862 establishments in England
1929 disestablishments in England